S. M. H. Mashoor as a Ceylonese lawyer and politician. A proctor, he was a United National Party member of the Senate of Ceylon from 1965 to 1971.

References

Ceylonese proctors
Sri Lankan Moor lawyers
Members of the Senate of Ceylon
Alumni of Ceylon Law College
United National Party politicians